Stein Torleif Bjella (born 7 April 1968) is a Norwegian songwriter, singer and guitarist.

Bjella was born in Ål, in the region of Hallingdal. His first solo album Heidersmenn from 2009 was well received. He was awarded Spellemannprisen for the 2011 folk music album Vonde visu. In 2013 he released his third solo album, Heim for å døy. In 2016 he released the album Gode liv.

In 2017, Bjella released the poetry book Jordsjukantologien Nr. 1. The following year, he released the album Jordsjukantologien, featuring his poetry  set to music.

Discography 

 Heidersmenn (2009)
 Vonde Visu (2011)
 Heim For å Døy (2013)
 Gode Liv (2016)
 Jordsjukantologien (2018)
 Øvre-Ål Toneakademi (2020)

References

1968 births
Living people
People from Ål
Norwegian singer-songwriters